The 2002 Parramatta Eels season was the 56th in the club's history. Coached by Brian Smith and captained by Nathan Cayless, they competed in the National Rugby League's 2002 Telstra Premiership.

Summary
Parramatta started the 2002 season with a 64-6 victory over Penrith at Parramatta Stadium. The club would win seven of their first ten games to sit fourth on the competition ladder. However, towards the back end of the year the club would lose six games in a row. The 2002 season ended with Parramatta finishing in sixth place. The side lost in the first week of the finals 24–14 to the Brisbane Broncos at what was then known as Telstra Stadium. However, this loss resulted in the elimination of the club from the 2002 Finals Series as seventh place St. George Illawarra upset the defending premiers, Newcastle.

Standings

Awards
Michael Cronin clubman of the year award: Andrew Ryan
Ken Thornett Medal (Players' player): Nathan Hindmarsh
Jack Gibson Award (Coach's award): Luke Burt
Eric Grothe Rookie of the Year Award: Ashley Graham

References

Parramatta Eels seasons
Parramatta Eels season